Mimolagrida rufa is a species of beetle in the family Cerambycidae. It was described by Stephan von Breuning in 1947. It is known from Madagascar.

Varietas
 Mimolagrida rufa var. rufotibialis Breuning, 1957
 Mimolagrida rufa var. fuscofemorata Breuning, 1957

References

Tragocephalini
Beetles described in 1947